Apaščia is a river of Biržai district municipality, Panevėžys County, northern Lithuania. It flows for 88 kilometres and has a basin area of 893 km².

It is a left tributary of the Nemunėlis.

References
 

Rivers of Lithuania
Biržai District Municipality